Sosoliso Airlines Limited was a scheduled, domestic, passenger airline. For much of its existence it had its head office in Ikeja, Lagos State. Originally its head office was on the grounds of Enugu Airport in Enugu.

History
It was established in 1994 and started operations in July 2000. The Nigerian government set a deadline of 30 April 2007 for all airlines operating in the country to re-capitalise or be grounded, in an effort to ensure better services and safety. Seven airlines failed to meet the deadline and as a result would not be allowed to fly in Nigeria's airspace with effect from 30 April 2007. These were: ADC Airlines, Fresh Air, Sosoliso Airlines, Albarka Air, Chrome Air Service, Dasab Airlines and Space World Airline. The affected airlines would only fly when they satisfied the Nigerian Civil Aviation Authority (NCAA)’s criteria in terms of re-capitalization and thus be re-registered for operation.

Destinations

Sosoliso Airlines operated flights to Enugu, Port Harcourt, Owerri, Abuja and Lagos. Reservations are possible.

Accidents and incidents
 Sosoliso Airlines Flight 1145

See also

 Airlines of Africa

References

External links

Sosoliso Airlines (Archive)
Profile of the airline

Defunct airlines of Nigeria
Airlines established in 1994
Airlines disestablished in 2007
Defunct companies based in Lagos
2007 disestablishments in Nigeria
Nigerian companies established in 1994